The 2002 Minnesota Golden Gophers football team represented the University of Minnesota in the 2002 NCAA Division I-A football season. In their sixth year under head coach Glen Mason, the Golden Gophers compiled an 8-5 record and outscored their opponents by a combined total of 376 to 319. The 2001 Minnesota Golden Gophers football team was not ranked in either the final USA Today/AFCA Coaches poll or Associated Press poll.

Redshirt freshman defensive end Brandon Hall was shot and killed on September 1, 2002 in downtown Minneapolis after a fight that involved other teammates and other individuals.  Hall's killer was convicted in his murder.

Schedule

Roster

Team players in the NFL

References

Minnesota
Minnesota Golden Gophers football seasons
Music City Bowl champion seasons
Minnesota Golden Gophers football